Akihito (written: 明仁, 明人, 昭仁, 顕仁, 章仁, 暁人, 彰人, 昭人 or 章人) is a masculine Japanese given name. Notable people with the name include:

, 125th Emperor of Japan
, 75th Emperor of Japan
, Japanese baseball player
, Japanese shogi player
, Japanese footballer
, Japanese Paralympic athlete
, Japanese professional wrestler
, Japanese ice hockey player
, Japanese musician and composer
, Japanese rugby union player
, Japanese golfer
, Japanese manga artist

Japanese masculine given names